Jay Lovett (born 2 January 1978) is an English football manager and former player who is currently manager of Haywards Heath Town.

He spent his career playing in league football as a defender and midfielder with Brentford and also non-League football in both county level, with Saltdean United, and in national level where he has played for the majority of his career with Crawley Town and Eastbourne Borough.

Playing career

Early career
Lovett started his career in East Sussex for Lewes, making his debut for them 11 February 1995 as they lost 4–0 away at Leighton Town in Isthmian League Division Three. Later that year he moved to the west country and Plymouth Argyle in Devon but was unable to start a first team game, after which he moved back to Sussex and played for Saltdean United in Division One of the Sussex County League. He also spent time youth coaching at the University of Central Florida. A season later he moved to Crawley Town in 1998 and played for two seasons. Second Division team Brentford took interest in Lovett, after watching him in a pre-season friendly and paid Crawley their record sum of £60,000 for the midfielder in July 2000, with a further £15,000 to be paid after 15 appearances.

Brentford
In his first year at Brentford he was back on loan to Crawley Town for nine games before making 28 appearances for the first team. In 2003, Lovett made two more loan signings, firstly at Hereford United where he played for two months, and a month at Gravesend & Northfleet, before his contract expired at the end of the 2002–03 season.

Non-League football
Farnborough Town manager, Tommy Taylor signed Lovett in June, although he played nine games, he transferred to Lewes later in the year. In 2004, Aldershot Town signed Lovett on a month loan.

Lovett joined Sussex rivals Eastbourne Borough in June 2006. He spent the end of their 2006–07 campaign with a broken collarbone, but helped the team win promotion into the Conference National league at the end of the 2007–08 season via the Conference South play-off final against Hampton & Richmond Borough, the game ending 2–0.

He played in Eastbourne's first ever season in the Conference National, scoring two goals and helping to win the Sussex Senior Cup in a 1–0 win over Brighton & Hove Albion reserves, before being released in May 2009 failing to agree to a new deal with the club, scoring seven goals in 149 appearances.

At the start of the 2009–10 season, Lovett signed for Whitehawk despite having offers from clubs in higher divisions, such as Grays Athletic in the Conference National, Havant & Waterlooville in the Conference South and Worthing in Isthmian League Division One South.

In June 2010, Lovett signed for Isthmian League Premier Division club Horsham.

Failing to hold down a regular starting berth at Horsham, Lovett joined fellow Isthmian League club Tooting & Mitcham United in October 2010. During his spell at Imperial Fields, Lovett was made the club captain and was instrumental in ensuring that Tooting & Mitcham avoided relegation. In March 2011, Lovett left Tooting & Mitcham in order to take up a position as assistant manager with Vietnamese V-League side Đồng Tâm Long An, working as assistant to Simon McMenemy.

After a full season with Lewes in 2013–14, he re-signed as a player for Eastbourne Borough ahead of the 2014–15 season, already being a full-time academy manager there. A dual registration deal between The Sports and Metropolitan Police materialised on 14 October 2014.

On 23 May 2015, Lovett returned to Lewes to become the club's new assistant manager and academy director, and in June he also registered as player.

On 19 October 2015, he signed for a third spell with Metropolitan Police, as an assistant manager/player.

He started the 2016–17 as an unused substitute in the two opening league games for Burgess Hill Town, before signing for Loxwood in September.

While being the manager of South Park, he made comeback as a player in the final game of the Isthmian League South Central Division 2018–19 season. He was named the manager of Burgess Hill Town of the South East Division in November 2019.

Lovett was sacked by Burgess Hill Town on 15 February 2023 and less than a week later appointed manager by Haywards Heath Town on 21 February 2023.

Personal life 
Lovett attended Dorothy Stringer High School and Varndean College. While a player with Saltdean United, he worked as an IT recruiter and at the time he joined Brentford in July 2000, was working for TSB. He is a Chelsea supporter.

Honours
Brentford
 Football League Trophy runner-up: 2001
 League One Play Off runner-up 2002

Eastbourne Borough
 Conference South play-offs: 2007–08
 Sussex Senior Cup: 2009

Whitehawk
 Sussex County League Division 1: 2009–10

References

External links

1978 births
Living people
Footballers from Brighton
English footballers
Association football defenders
Aldershot Town F.C. players
Brentford F.C. players
Burgess Hill Town F.C. players
Crawley Town F.C. players
Eastbourne Borough F.C. players
Ebbsfleet United F.C. players
Farnborough F.C. players
Hereford United F.C. players
Horsham F.C. players
Lewes F.C. players
Loxwood F.C. players
Metropolitan Police F.C. players
Plymouth Argyle F.C. players
Saltdean United F.C. players
South Park F.C. players
Tooting & Mitcham United F.C. players
Whitehawk F.C. players
English Football League players
National League (English football) players
British sports agents
South Park F.C. managers
Burgess Hill Town F.C. managers
Haywards Heath Town F.C. managers